The 2011–12 Professional Arena Soccer League season was the fourth season for the American professional indoor soccer league, now using the nickname "PASL" instead of "PASL-Pro". The San Diego Sockers became the first team in league history to finish a season undefeated. The Sockers won their third straight PASL Championship and the first Ron Newman Cup trophy by defeating the Detroit Waza 10-7 at the Del Mar Arena, home of the Sockers.

Standings
As of February 26, 2012

(Bold) Division Winner

Statistics

Top scorers

Last updated on February 26, 2012.

2012 Ron Newman Cup

Divisional Playoffs

Semi-Finals

Championship

Awards

Individual Awards

All-League First Team

All-League Second Team

See also
2011–12 United States Open Cup for Arena Soccer
2012 FIFRA Club Championship

References

External links
PASL official website

 
Professional Arena Soccer League
Professional Arena Soccer League
Professional Arena Soccer League seasons